The Norwegian Confederation of Trade Unions (LO) is a national trade union center, decidedly the largest and probably the most influential umbrella organization of labour unions in Norway. The 21 national unions affiliated to the LO have almost 1,000,000 members of a Norwegian population of 5 million. The majority of affiliated unions organizes traditional blue collar workers, but the largest affiliate is the Norwegian Union of Municipal and General Employees which makes up more than a third of all members. LO is affiliated to the ITUC and the ETUC.

It was named the Workers' National Trade Union (AFL) from 1899 to 1957. Affiliated with the Labour Party throughout its history, several of LO's member unions have concurrently been member bodies in the Labour Party. 

The organization owns the Norwegian Labour Movement Archives and Library.

Affiliates

Current affiliates

Former affiliates
{| class="wikitable sortable"
! Union !! Abbreviation !! Founded !! Left !! Reason not affiliated !! Membership (1924) !! Membership (1963) !! Membership (1991)
|-
| Garment Workers' Union || BAF || 1969 || 1988 || Merged into FF || N/A || N/A || N/A
|-
| Hotel and Restaurant Workers' Union || HRAF || 1931 || 2007 || Merged into FF || N/A || 9,345 || 16,036
|-
| National Union of District Police Officers || || 1914 || 1984 || Disaffiliated || || 800 || N/A
|-
| National Union of Postal Clerks || PLF || 1903 || 1977 || Merged into DNP || || 2,524 || N/A
|-
| Norwegian Air Force Officers' Union || || 1956 || || Disaffiliated || N/A || 1,660 || N/A
|-
| Norwegian Bakery and Confectionery Workers' Union || NBKF || 1893 || 1962 || Merged into NNN || 1,723 || N/A || N/A
|-
| Norwegian Barbers' and Hairdressers' Union || NBFF || || 1937 || Merged into NKF || 35 || N/A || N/A
|-
| Norwegian Cockpit Union || Cockpit || 2015 || 2016 || Merged into NF || N/A || 'N/A || N/A|-
| Norwegian Fire Brigades Union || || 1909 || 1925 || Merged into NKF || || N/A || N/A|-
| Norwegian Graphical Union || NGF || 1967 || 2006 || Merged into FF || N/A || N/A || 14,894
|-
| Norwegian Lithographic and Chemographic Union || || 1901 || 1967 || Merged into NGF || 480 || 1,837 || N/A|-
| Norwegian Musicians' Union || NM || 1911 || 2001 || Merged into Creo || N/A || 1,271 || 2,248
|-
| Norwegian Nurses' Union || NVF || 1962 || 1992 || Merged into FO || N/A || N/A || 2,421
|-
| Norwegian Oil and Petrochemical Union || NOPEF || 1977 || 2006 || Merged into IE || N/A || N/A || 8,797
|-
| Norwegian Post and Communications Union || POSTKOM || 2000 || 2020 || Merged into NUMGE || N/A || N/A || N/A|-
| Norwegian Post Organisation || DNP || 1977 || 2000 || Merged into POSTKOM || N/A || N/A || 15,442
|-
| Norwegian Social Workers' Union || NoSo || 1959 || 1992 || Merged into FO || N/A || N/A || 4,726
|-
| Norwegian Telecommunication and Data Workers' Union || TD || 1988 || 1998 || Merged into EL&IT || N/A || N/A || 16,387
|-
| Norwegian Telecommunication Organisation || DNTO || 1909 || 1988 || Merged into TD || || 1,638 || N/A|-
| Norwegian Tobacco Workers' Union || NTF || 1910 || 1962 || Merged into NNN || 702 || N/A || N/A|-
| Norwegian Tramway Union || || 1901 || 1921 || Merged into NKF || N/A || N/A || N/A|-
| Norwegian Transport Workers' Union || NTF || 1896 || 2019 || Merged into FF || 4,802 || 21,609 || 15,803
|-
| Norwegian Union of Bookbinders and Cardboard Workers || NBKF || 1898 || 1967 || Merged into NGF || 1,246 || 4,556 || N/A|-
| Norwegian Union of Bricklayers || NMF || 1900 || 1976 || Merged into NBIAF || 2,354 || 5,023 || N/A|-
| Norwegian Union of Building Industry Workers || NBIAF || 1923 || 1988 || Merged into FF || 7,440 || 51,394 || N/A|-
| Norwegian Union of Cantors and Organists || NKOF || 1904 || 2001 || Merged into Creo || N/A || N/A || 775
|-
| Norwegian Union of Chemical Industry Workers || NKIF || 1923 || 2006 || Merged into IE || 4,955 || 30,595 || 34,896
|-
| Norwegian Union of Child Welfare Educators || NBF || 1969 || 1992 || Merged into FO || N/A || N/A || 2,020
|-
| Norwegian Union of Clothing Workers || BAF || 1892 || 1969 || Merged into BAF || 1,080 || 14,259 || N/A|-
| Norwegian Union of Customs Officials || || 1904 || || Disaffiliated || || 1,050 || N/A|-
| Norwegian Union of Electricians and Power Station Officials || NEKF || 1918 || 1999 || Merged into EL&IT || 1,466 || 12,152 || 27,151
|-
| Norwegian Union of Forestry and Land Workers || NSLF || 1927 || 1988 || Merged into FF || N/A || 20,369 || N/A|-
| Norwegian Union of Foundry Workers || || 1898 || 1960 || Merged into NJMF || 1,650 || N/A || N/A|-
| Norwegian Union of Gold Workers || NGAF || 1909 || 1985 || Merged into NJMF || 435 || 1,033 || N/A|-
| Norwegian Union of Hide and Leather Workers || || 1909 || 1973 || Merged into BAF || 426 || 1,300 || N/A|-
| Norwegian Union of Iron and Metalworkers || NJMF || 1891 || 1988 || Merged into FF || 11,265 || 75,028 || N/A|-
| Norwegian Union of Journeymen Watchmakers || || 1947 || 1983 || || N/A || 89 || N/A|-
| Norwegian Union of Marine Pilots || || 1946 || || || N/A || 449 || N/A|-
| Norwegian Union of Meat Industry Workers || NKIF || 1907 || 1970 || Merged into NNN || 524 || 4,024 || N/A|-
| Norwegian Union of Municipal Employees || NKF || 1920 || 2003 || Merged into NUMGE || 5,835 || 59,831 || 200,320
|-
| Norwegian Union of Painters || || 1896 || 1923 || Merged into NBIAF || N/A || N/A || N/A|-
| Norwegian Union of Paper Industry Workers || NPF || 1913 || 1988 || Merged into FF || 10,162 || 19,088 || N/A|-
| Norwegian Union of Planing Workers || || 1911 || 1949 || Merged into NBIAF || 3,882 || N/A || N/A|-
| Norwegian Union of Police || NPF || 1905 || 1997 || Merged into PF || || 2,213 || N/A|-
| Norwegian Union of Postal Officials || DNP || 1884 || 1977 || Merged into DNP || || 3,127 || N/A|-
| Norwegian Union of Postmen || NPF || 1901 || 2000 || Merged into POSTKOM || 959 || 4,426 || 14,498
|-
| Norwegian Union of Shoe Makers || || 1890 || 1969 || Merged into BAF || 1,934 || 3,833 || N/A|-
| Norwegian Union of Stone Industry Workers || || 1894 || 1961 || Merged into NBIAF || 873 || N/A || N/A|-
| Norwegian Union of Telecommunication Workers || NTTF || 1930 || 1988 || Merged into TD || N/A || 8,047 || N/A|-
| Norwegian Union of Textile Workers || NTF || 1924 || 1969 || Merged into BAF || N/A || 9,902 || N/A|-
| Norwegian Union of Typographers || || 1882 || 1967 || Merged into NGF || 7,440 || 6,363 || N/A|-
| Norwegian Union of Wood Industry Workers || NTAF || 1904 || 2009 || Merged into IE || 1,200 || 5,743 || 5,122
|-
| Wood Workers' Union of Norway || || 1889 || 1923 || Merged into NBIAF || N/A || N/A || N/A|}

See also
Leaders of the Norwegian Confederation of Trade Unions
LO Stat
Danish Confederation of Trade Unions (Danish LO)
Swedish Trade Union Confederation (Swedish LO'')

References

External links
 Official website
National Unions of the Norwegian Confederation of Trade Unions 

 
1899 establishments in Norway
Organisations based in Oslo
Trade unions established in 1899